Pete Walter (29 March 1905 – 23 September 1974) was a Canadian middle-distance runner. He competed in the men's 1500 metres at the 1928 Summer Olympics.

References

1905 births
1974 deaths
Athletes (track and field) at the 1928 Summer Olympics
Canadian male middle-distance runners
Olympic track and field athletes of Canada
Place of birth missing